István Marton (born 15 November 1944) is a Hungarian Olympic fencer. He competed in the team foil event at the 1972 Summer Olympics.

References

External links
 

1944 births
Living people
Hungarian male foil fencers
Olympic fencers of Hungary
Fencers at the 1972 Summer Olympics
Sportspeople from Keszthely